Tmesisternus griseus is a species of beetle in the family Cerambycidae. It was described by James Thomson in 1865.

Subspecies
 Tmesisternus griseus griseus (Thomson, 1865)
 Tmesisternus griseus agrarius Pascoe, 1867

References

griseus
Beetles described in 1865